The 2017 Premiership Rugby Sevens Series was the eighth rugby union 7-a-side competition for the twelve 2017–18 Aviva Premiership clubs, and the first to exclude the four Welsh Regions which compete in the Pro14, since 2013. It was also the first to feature a new format with all twelve teams together in one venue over two days.

The competition was held at Franklin's Gardens on 28 and 29 July 2017.

Format
The twelve teams were split into four groups – A, B, C & D. Each team in the group played each other once, to World Rugby Laws of the Game – 7s Variations. 
Based on the result, teams received:
 4 points for a win
 2 points for a draw
 1 bonus point for a loss by seven points or less
 1 bonus point for scoring four or more tries in a match

Following all matches in each group, the winner and runner-up in each group progressed to the quarter-finals and the third-placed team progressed to the bowl semi-final. The winners of each quarter-final qualified for the cup semi-finals, with the losers moving into a new plate tournament. Thereafter, competition was a simple knockout bracket, with the winner of the cup final being declared the series winner.

Group stage

Date: Friday, 28 July 2017
Venue: Franklin's Gardens, Northampton

Group A

Group B

Group C

Group D

Finals stage
Finals day was played at Franklin's Gardens on Saturday, 29 July 2017.

The four pool winners played a quarter-final against a runner-up from another or the same pool. The winner of these quarter-finals competed in the cup competition, while the losers competed in the plate competition. The remaining four teams competed in the bowl competition.

Quarter-finals

Bowl competition

Bowl semi-finals

Bowl final

Plate competition

Plate semi-finals

Plate final

Cup competition

Semi-finals

Final

References

2017–18
Sevens
2017 rugby sevens competitions